Charlotte Mitchell (born Edna Winifred Mitchell; 23 July 1926 – 2 May 2012) was an English actress and poet.

Biography

In the 1950s she provided lyrics, sketches, and occasionally acted in revues on London's West End. She was especially successful in her ventures providing lyrics for Madeleine Dring in Airs on a Shoestring (1953), Pay the Piper (1954), and Fresh Airs (1956), all productions of Laurier Lister.

She was once (allegedly) the girlfriend of Peter Sellers, and appeared in The Goon Show episodes Ye Bandit of Sherwood Forest (1954) as Maid Marian and Tales of Montmartre (1956) as Seagoon's love interest, Fifi. Charlotte Mitchell was married to the actor Philip Guard, from whom she separated in 1968, and was the mother of three children: actors Christopher Guard and Dominic Guard and animator and novelist Candy Guard. Charlotte lived in West London during the later part of her life and continued to be active as a poet.

She appeared on BBC Radio with Ian Carmichael in The Small, Intricate Life of Gerald C. Potter. Carmichael played Gerald C. Potter, mystery writer, while she played Diana, his wife, who, under the pseudonym of Miss Magnolia Badminton, wrote romantic novels. She also played, on radio, the Dowager Duchess (Lord Peter Wimsey's mother) in the radio adaption of Strong Poison that starred Ian Carmichael as Peter Wimsey and the character of Kath Miller in the BBC Radio 2 daily serial Waggoners' Walk. On television, she played Amy Winthrop the housekeeper in The Adventures of Black Beauty (1972–74), and Monica Spencer in And Mother Makes Five.

Her poetry was published in collections such as "Twelve Burnt Saucepans", "Looking Round Dangerously", "I Want to Go Home" and "Just in Case". These provided the basis of a series of popular programmes on BBC Radio 4 in which she read her own work. Her poetry is often requested and read on the BBC Radio 4's Poetry Please, and one of her poems was chosen by Judi Dench and Michael Williams in their joint BBC Radio 4 programme With Great Pleasure.

Death
She died in Chiswick, London, on 2 May 2012, aged 85 from pneumonia. She had previously battled breast cancer and myeloma.

Filmography

Films
 The Romantic Age (1949, Naughty Arlette 1950 in the US) – Charlotte (uncredited)
 The Happiest Days of Your Life (1950) – Ethel (uncredited)
 Laughter in Paradise (1951) – Ethel
 The Man in the White Suit (1951) – Mill Girl
 Lady Godiva Rides Again (1951) – Lucille
 Curtain Up (1952) – Daphne Ray
 Time Bomb (1953) – Buffet Waitress (uncredited)
 The Story of Gilbert and Sullivan (1953) (or The Great Gilbert and Sullivan in the US) – Charlotte
 Street Corner (1953, Both Sides of the Law 1954 in the US) – Lily Propert (uncredited)
 Lost (1955, Tears for Simon 1957 in the US) – Farmer's Wife (uncredited)
 The Bridal Path (1959) – Mrs. Mavis Bruce (uncredited)
 Village of the Damned (1960) – Janet Pawle
 Dentist in the Chair (1960) – Woman in Surgery
 Nearly a Nasty Accident (1961) – Miss Chamberlain
 Dentist on the Job (1961, Get on with It! 1963 in the US) – Mrs. Burke
 The Blood on Satan's Claw (1970) – Ellen
 Jim, the World's Greatest (1975) – School Secretary
 The French Lieutenant's Woman (1981) – Mrs. Tranter
 Out of the Darkness (1985) – Mrs. Barrow
 The First Kangaroos (1988) – Mrs. Oaks

Television
 Not in Front of the Children (1967–1970) – Mary
 Dombey and Son (1969) - Polly "Richards" Toodle
 Persuasion (1971) – Mrs. Clay
 The Adventures of Black Beauty (1972–1974) – Amy Winthrop
 The Kids from 47A (1973, Writer)
 ...And Mother Makes Five (1974–1976) – Monica Spencer
 In This House of Brede (1975, TV Movie) – Mrs. Fraser
 Miss Jones and Son (1977) – Mum
 Shades of Darkness (1983) – Mrs. Blinder
 Return to Treasure Island (1986) – Mrs. Hawkins
 The Woman He Loved (1988, TV Movie) – Lady Chatfield
 Selling Hitler (1991) – Lady Katherine Giles
 Pond Life (1996) – Ivy
 Heartbeat (1997–1999) – Granny Bellamy (final appearance)

References

Further reading
Brister, Wanda. Madeleine Dring: The Lady Composer

External links
 Obituary – The Guardian
 

1926 births
2012 deaths
Deaths from cancer in England
Deaths from pneumonia in England
Deaths from multiple myeloma
English film actresses
English television actresses
English radio actresses
Actors from Ipswich
Actresses from Suffolk
20th-century British businesspeople